Buz is a village and a former municipality in the Gjirokastër County, southern Albania. At the 2015 local government reform it became a subdivision of the municipality Memaliaj. The population at the 2011 census was 737. The municipal unit consists of the villages Buz, Kalemaj, Badër, Kurtjez, Golemaj, Arrëz e Vogël, Shalës, Xhafaj, Gllavë, Selckë, Selckë e Vogël, Komar and Bardhaj.

A statue can be found there for Tafil Buzi (1792-1844).

References

Former municipalities in Gjirokastër County
Administrative units of Memaliaj
Villages in Gjirokastër County